Dato' Sri Lee Ee Hoe, JP (born 5 July 1964), also known as Leesan, is the first recipient in the tourism industry worldwide to be bestowed the Imperial Decoration Order of the Rising Sun, Gold and Silver Rays by the Emperor of Japan in 2015. This is in recognition of his longstanding contributions in the development and promotion of tourism between Japan and Malaysia, as well as his bold move to lead the first tour to Japan soon after Japan's devastating tsunami and earthquake in 2011.

On 28 Dec 2020, Lee was awarded the Miri Mayor Special Award in recognition for his contributions and support towards Sarawak’s tourism during the Covid-19 pandemic.  

On 17 July 2015, he launched his first book at the Hong Kong Book Fair about his travel experiences and his perspective of the world.

On 12 July 2021, he launched his second travel book in Kuala Lumpur, Malaysia.

As of February 2023, Lee has traveled to 136 countries and is a member of Traveler's Century Club located in California, United States.

Early life and education 
Lee was born in Yong Peng, Johor. His interest in travel and sharing travel information started at a  young age. In school, he and his friend and future business partner, planned scouting trips for their school troops. After secondary school, he became a licensed tourist guide in Malaysia. He continued his tertiary education in Japan and graduated with a Bachelor of Arts in Economics from Tokyo International University. After graduating, he returned to Malaysia with experience in the Japanese tour industry and set up a travel agency, Apple Vacations Sdn Bhd in 1996.

Business career 
Lee is the co-founder and Group Executive Chairman of Apple Vacations Sdn Bhd (Formerly known as Apple Vacations & Conventions Sdn Bhd), the first overseas travel agency to receive the "Japan Tourism Agency Commissioner’s Commendation Award". Apple Vacations also introduced Malaysia Airlines' first charter flight to Hokkaido in 2010. He is the Lifetime Overseas Advisor of Taiwanese Leisure Farming Development Association since 2009.

He is also best known for his work in the tourism industry and is an active columnist for newspapers, magazines and other publications.

As of July 2021, he has authored 5 travel books.

Lee is also the executive director for main board-listed company Yong Tai Berhad (7066), which holds the licence to produce and stage Impression Melaka. The Impression Melaka show, scheduled to be launched in February 2018, was expected to attract 1.2 million tourists per year, generating RM179 million of gross national income for Malaysia. It is a tourism project under the National Key Economic Area. In February 2013, a memorandum was signed with China Impression Wonders Art Development Co Ltd. The project was endorsed by Malaysian Tourism and Culture Minister Dato' Seri Nazri Aziz and the project launch in May in Beijing was witnessed by former Tourism Minister Tan Sri Datuk Seri Dr Ng Yen Yen.

International business ventures 
In 2014, Apple Vacations Sdn Bhd started collaborating with Marriott International to develop the first Courtyard by Marriott in Malacca. It is planned to be in Malacca's central tourism district and to open in 2017.

Awards and recognition

Honours of Malaysia
  :
 Miri Mayor Special Award (2020)  

  :
  Medal for Outstanding Public Service Bronze Medal (PMC) (2004)
 Justice of the Peace (JP) (2008)

  :
  Knight Companion of the Order of the Crown of Pahang (DIMP) - Dato' (2007)
  Grand Knight of the Order of Sultan Ahmad Shah of Pahang (SSAP) - Dato' Sri (2013)

 Individual Award of "1st Malaysia Golden Entrepreneurs Award – Best Of The Best Leading Industry Award of 2013" (2014) by The Federation of Malaysia Chinese Guilds Association

Foreign honours
  :
 "Japan Tourism Agency Commissioner’s Commendation Award 2013" (2013) by Japan Tourism Agency
 "Mie Prefecture Overseas Tourism Ambassador" (2014) by Government of Mie Prefecture Japan
  5th Class, Gold and Silver Rays of the Order of the Rising Sun (2015) by Emperor of Japan

References

External links 

 Apple Vacations
 Yong Tai Berhad
 Impression Melaka

1964 births
Living people
Malaysian businesspeople
People from Johor
Recipients of the Order of the Rising Sun, 5th class